Abaye was a rabbi of the Jewish Talmud who lived in Babylonia, known as an amora of the fourth generation. He was born about the close of the third century, and died 337 CE.

Biography
His father, Kaylil, was the brother of Rabbah bar Nachmani (Rabbah), a teacher at the Academy of Pumbedita. Abaye's real name was Nachmani, after his grandfather. Left an orphan at an early age, he was adopted by his uncle, Rabbah. Opinions differ as to the source of his nickname Abaye. Some say it is a diminutive of the word abba (father), meaning "Little Father", to avoid confusion with his grandfather of the same name (or perhaps to show respect for that grandfather). Others say that Abaye was not a nickname, but an acronym of the Biblical phrase "For through You the orphan receives mercy", alluding to Abaye's being an orphan. A modern opinion is that Abaye is an old Aramaic word meaning "comfort", and thus a direct translation of his Hebrew name, Nachmani.

From then on he was known as Abaye, without any other title. Abaye was a skilled juggler, and would entertain his uncle by juggling during Simchat Beit HaShoeivah celebrations.

It is a curious fact that he perpetuated the memory of his foster-mother by mentioning her name in many popular recipes and dietetic precepts, some of which seem to be based on superstitious notions. He introduced each recipe with the phrase, "My mother told me."

Abaye's teachers were his uncle Rabbah and Rav Yosef bar Hiyya, both of whom successively became presidents of the Pumbedita Academy. When Rav Yosef died (324 CE), this dignity was conferred upon Abaye, who retained it until his death five years later. Rabbah trained him in the application of the dialectic method to halakhic problems, and Rav Yosef, with his stores of traditional knowledge, taught him to appreciate the value of positive knowledge.

Abaye was never so happy as when one of his disciples had completed the study of a Mishnah treatise. On such occasions, he always gave a feast to his pupils, though his circumstances were needy, and wine never appeared upon his table.

Abaye was a kohen. Although a descendant of the House of Eli, he died at the age of 60. He was the father of Bebai ben Abaye.

Teaching
Despite Abaye's greatness in dialectic analysis of halakha, he was surpassed in this regard by Rava, with whom he had been closely associated from early youth. To the disputations between these amoraim we owe the development of the dialectic method in the treatment of halakhic traditions. Their debates are known as the "Havayot d'Abaye ve'Rava" (Debates of Abaye and Rava), the subjects of which were then considered such essential elements of Talmudic knowledge that by an anachronism they were thought to be known to Yohanan ben Zakkai, who lived some centuries before. Their halakhic controversies are scattered throughout the Babylonian Talmud. With the exception of six of his decisions, known by the acronym Yael Kagam (יע"ל קג"ם), the opinions of Rava were always accepted as final.

In Biblical exegesis, he was one of the first to draw a distinct line between the evident meaning of the text (peshat) and the sense ascribed to it by midrashic interpretation. He formulated the following rule, of great importance in Talmudic legal exegesis: "One Bible verse can be referred to different subjects, but several different Bible verses can not refer to one and the same subject." He defended the Apocryphal book Ecclesiasticus against his teacher Rav Yosef. By quoting from it a number of edifying passages, he showed that it did not belong to the heretical books which are forbidden, and even compelled his teacher to admit that quotations might usefully be taken from it for homiletical purposes.

Possessing an extensive knowledge of tradition, Abaye became an eager disciple of Dimi, the Israeli amora, who had brought to Babylonia many interpretations by Israel amoraim. Abaye considered Dimi, as a representative of the Israel school, a qualified Bible exegete, and used to ask him how this or that Bible verse was explained in "the West," or Israel.

Of Abaye's own interpretations of Biblical passages only a few, of a aggadic nature, are preserved; but he often supplements, elucidates, or corrects the opinions of older authorities.

Quotes
A man should always be cunning in [his] reverence [towards God]. A gentle answer quells anger, and increases peace with his brethren and his relations, as well as with every man—even with a gentile in the market-place, so that he may become beloved above and desired below, and accepted by his fellow man.
 You should cause the name of Heaven to become beloved by you: one should read and recite and serve talmidei hachamim, and engage in business pleasantly with people. What will people say of him? "Praiseworthy is his father who taught him Torah; praiseworthy is his rabbi who taught him Torah; woe to people who have not learned Torah; this person who has learned Torah, see how beautiful his ways are and how proper his deeds."

See also
Yiush

References

 It has the following bibliography:
Isaac Lampronti, Pachad Yitzchak, s.v.
Heilprin, Seder ha-Dorot, pp. 22–25
Hamburger, R. B. T., 1883, part ii., s.v.
Alexander Kohut, Aruch, s.v. (in which is found an enumeration of all the passages of the Talmud containing Abaye's name)
Bacher, Ag. Bab. Amor. s.v.
Isaac Hirsch Weiss, Dor
M. S. Antokolski in Ha-Asif, 1885, ii. 503–506, with Straschun's notes.

3rd-century births
339 deaths
Rabbis of Academy of Pumbedita
4th-century rabbis